Synaus or Synaos, also spelled Synnaus or Synnaos (Σύνναος), was a city in the Roman province of Phrygia Pacatiana, now Simav, Kütahya Province, Turkey.

History and location

Nothing is known of the history of this city, which Ptolemy locates in Great Phrygia, and 6th-century Hierocles, in Phrygia Pacatiana, whose capital was Laodicea. It has a few inscriptions but no ruins.

The 2013 edition of the Annuario Pontificio puts Synaus in the late Roman province of Phrygia Pacatiana Secumda whose civil capital and metropolitan see was Hierapolis. In the early 20th century, Sophrone Pétridès placed it in Phrygia Pacatiana Prima, whose capital and metropolitan see was Laodicea on the Lycus.

According to Pétridès, in 1394 the see of Synaus was united to that of Philadelphia (Roman province of Lydia); in the 7th century it was a suffragan of Laodicea on the Lycus (in Phrygia Pacatiana Prima); it seems also that at this time it was united to the see of Ancyra Ferrea (in Phrygia Pacatiana Secunda). In the 9th century it was attached to the metropolis of Hierapolis (capital of Phrygia Pacatiana Secunda) and remained so till its disappearance, as appears from the Greek Notitiae episcopatuum.

Bishops

Le Quien mentions the following bishops: 

Arabius, represented by his metropolitan at Chalcedon (451); 
Pronimus, at Constantinople (553); 
Stephanus, at Nicæa (787); 
Constantine at Constantinople (869); 
Sisinnius and Eusebius, supporters respectively of St. Ignatius and Photius, at the Council of Constantinople (879-880); 
Isaac, at the Council of Constantinople (1351), which approved the doctrines of Palamas. 

To these may be added Stephanus, whose name occurs in the inscription (8th century?) "Corp. inser. græc.", 8666 perhaps the Stephanus mentioned in 787.

References

Populated places in Phrygia
Former populated places in Turkey
Roman towns and cities in Turkey
Populated places of the Byzantine Empire
History of Kütahya Province
Catholic titular sees in Asia